Annie Hayden was one of four members of the 1990s indie rock band Spent. She later embarked on a solo career, releasing "The Rub" in 2001 and "The Enemy of Love" in 2005, both on Merge Records.

Track listings

The Rub (2001)
"Start a Little Late" (2:49)
"Slip is Showing" (3:12)
"The Land of Nod" (1:39)
"Alone"  (2:25)
"Wood and Glue" (3:51)
"Albatross" (3:05)
"Red Lines" (2:15)
"Guitar Lesson" (2:02)
"Sign of Your Love" (2:38)
"Pistol and Glasses" (2:15)
"Lovely to See" (7:51)
"untitled"

The Enemy of Love (2005)
"Cara Mia" (2:52)
"Hip Hurray" (3:40)
"Anytime" (1:14)
"Your Carnival" (3:09)
"Boos" (1:39)
"Weather" (2:54)
"Money Trouble" (2:49)
"Gray" (2:01)
"Swingin' Party" (3:36)
"Piano" (1:14)
"Wait For Returns" (3:37)
"Starring in the Movies" (3:02)
"Willie's Fortune" (4:12)

References 

American indie rock musicians
American singer-songwriters
American rock songwriters
American rock singers
Living people
Year of birth missing (living people)
Merge Records artists